Timofiy Bilohradsky (also Belogradsky, Pelogradsky; ; ca. 1710 — ca. 1782) was a  lutenist, composer and kobzar-bandurist of Ukrainian ethnicity, active in St. Petersburg and Königsberg.

Little is known about his childhood. He is thought to have been born in or near the city of Cherkasy in Ukraine and that he learned to play the kobza and lute at the Hlukhiv Music Academy in Ukraine. He had an excellent voice and great musical aptitude. In 1725 he was invited to St Petersburg to sing in the Imperial Church Capella. In 1733 Tsarina Anna sent Bilohradsky to Dresden in the retinue of the ambassador Count Keyserlinck to perfect his lute playing under the tutelage of Silvius Leopold Weiss - the most important lutenist-composer of the 18th century. He also studied voice with Faustina Bordoni-Hasse, and castrato Domenico Annibali. Bilohradsky eventually became one of the highest trained musicians in the Russian Court Capella. 

In 1739, Bilohradsky returned to St Petersburg, where he continued to work as a court musician. In 1741 he returned to Germany where he became known as a virtuoso lutenist and singer and for some time lived in Königsberg where he had a number of students - notably Johann Reichardt (father of Johann Friedrich Reichardt), and Johann Georg Hamann, the Sturm-und-Drang philosopher. 

In his last years he lived in Petersburg. The "Moscow Weiss Manuscript" is ascribed to Bilohradsky or his circle. As a composer Bilohradsky is known for a set of songs and romances to the texts by Sumarokov that enjoyed considerable popularity in the 18th century. 

His niece, Yelizaveta Belogradskaya, became famous as a first Russian opera-singer, she sang at the Imperial St. Petersburg opera and was also known as a composer.

References
Biodata (in Russian)

1710s births
1780s deaths
Musicians from Cherkasy
People from Kiev Voivodeship
Bandurists
Kobzars
Torbanists
Ukrainian classical musicians
Ukrainian classical composers
Classical-period composers
Ukrainian lutenists
18th-century classical composers
18th-century male musicians
18th-century musicians
Male classical composers